Clinton W. Evans (April 2, 1889 – March 10, 1975) was an American college baseball coach at the University of California, Berkeley from 1930 to 1954. He retired with a career record of 547–256. Cal's baseball field was renamed Evans Diamond in his honor. Evans died at age 85 in Orinda, California. He was elected to the University of California Hall of Fame in 1986.

References
Obituaries, The Sporting News, April 12, 1975, p. 62.

1889 births
1975 deaths
California Golden Bears baseball coaches
People from Orinda, California
University of California, Berkeley alumni
Baseball coaches from California